Stan Fortuna, C.F.R., (born June 9, 1957) is a Catholic priest notable for his evangelical musical contributions of various genres, primarily Catholic-based jazz and hip hop.

Biography
Fortuna is a United States citizen of Italian and Greek heritage. His lifelong interest in music began in the second grade when he received an electric guitar for Christmas.  He spent his formative years playing improvisational sessions in and around New York City. Fortuna studied with the legendary jazz musician, Lennie Tristano, and was an accomplished professional bass player before becoming a priest.

Career
Fortuna is one of the eight original members of the Community of Franciscan Friars of the Renewal, a Franciscan order established by Cardinal John Joseph O'Connor in 1987. Father Stan was ordained as a priest in the Bronx in 1990.

Father Fortuna established the non-profit Francesco Productions in 1987 as a means to record and distribute evangelical music, video productions and books as well as handle his speaking and concert engagements; all proceeds benefit the Community's work with the poor of the South Bronx where he lives. Francesco International Love Outreach was later started to assist in working with the poverty-stricken outside of the US, including the underprivileged in Uganda and Poland.

An international speaker, Father Fortuna has been a featured presenter at numerous Franciscan youth conferences like Steubenville and has numerous appearances to his credit on the EWTN program, Life on the Rock. He frequently performs and lectures in the United States and countries in Europe and Africa.  His work and music have garnered articles in a number of publications including the US hip hop magazine XXL and in the New York Press; he has also appeared on Entertainment Tonight Canada and MuchMusic's "Popoganda".

Father Fortuna has released over 18 CDs in a variety of musical genres. His latest rap CD is Sacro Song 3: The Completion of the Trilogy, and "Seraphic Wanderer", containing a variety of musical styles and released in 2009, is dedicated to his mother. He has also released a jazz CD through Universal Music with his trio, Scola Tristano. He has written three books U Got 2 Believe, U Got 2 Pray and U Got 2 Love - all published by OSV.

A documentary on his life and work entitled Sent has been produced. His third inspirational book U Got 2 Love was released in December 2009.

Among his most memorable songs are Everybody Got 2 Suffer and Cell 91 from the album [https://web.archive.org/web/20060508203849/http://www.francescoproductions.com/music/sacrosong2.html Sacro Song II].

Father Fortuna spends most of his time preaching and doing concerts in the United States, Canada, Africa and Europe. During 2008 he performed at World Youth Day, Australia, participated in an international conference at the Divine Retreat Center in India and was keynote speaker at the Diocesan Youth Conference in Victoria, British Columbia.

Discography

Albums

Surrender To Stillness (1994)
Take My Heart (1995)
First Collection (1996)
Loved By You (1997)
Fr. Stan Live - The Spirit of the Lord and the Art of Improvising [Live] (1998)
Traditional Catholic Hymns (1999)
Second Collection (2000)
I Will Worship You (2000)
I Hear You Got Plans / Do You Love Me? [Single] (2000)
Sacro Song (1998)
Sacro Song II (2002)
Scola Tristano 
New Culture Concert Live in New York Jazz 
The Great One 
Christmas Culture: Sacred & Secular  
Brazilian Collection 
Adoration (2003)
Sacro Song 3: The Completion of the Trilogy (2006)
Seraphic Wanderer (2009)
Renewal (2012)
Word World: Poetic Invasion (2014)
I Will Sing (2017)
Spirit Of Christmas (1988)

Bibliography

Books

U Got 2 Believe (2001)
U Got 2 Pray: 100 Prayers for Daily Living in Modern Culture (2004)
U Got 2 Love (2009)

References

External links

Francesco Productions (Rev. Fortuna's official site)
Franciscan Friars of the Renewal
 Father Stan Fortuna, C.F.R., Promovideo for the World Youth Day in Sydney 2008

20th-century American Roman Catholic priests
21st-century American Roman Catholic priests
Franciscan Friars of the Renewal
Contemporary Catholic liturgical music
American bass guitarists
American rappers
1957 births
Living people
20th-century American guitarists
American people of Italian descent
American people of Greek descent
21st-century American rappers